No. 6 Squadron ( or LLv.6, from 3 May 1942 Le.Lv.6), renamed No. 6 Bomber Squadron (Finnish: Pommituslentolaivue 6 or PLe.Lv.6 on 14 February 1944) was a maritime bomber squadron of the Finnish Air Force during World War II. The squadron was part of Flying Regiment 5.

Organization

Continuation War
1st Flight (1. Lentue)
2nd Flight (2. Lentue)
3rd Flight (3. Lentue)
4th Flight (4. Lentue)
5th Flight (5. Lentue)

The equipment consisted of 5 Polikarpov I-153s, 2 Koolhoven F.K.52s, 14 Tupolev SBs, 3 Dornier Do 22KIs, 2 Marinens Flyvebaatfabrikk M.F.11s, 6 Blackburn Ripon IIFs, 3 Beriev MBR-2s and 1 Heinkel He 59B-2.

External links

Lentolaivue 6

06
Continuation War